Mixter Blacksmith Shop is a historic blacksmith shop located at Warrensburg, Warren County, New York.  It was built about 1840 in the Greek Revival style to house a commercial operation and modified about 1890 in the Queen Anne style to accommodate mixed use activities.  It is a two-story building built into a slope.  It is constructed of load-bearing local granite and topped by a medium pitched roof clad in raised seam metal.

It was added to the National Register of Historic Places in 2002.

References

Blacksmith shops
Commercial buildings on the National Register of Historic Places in New York (state)
Queen Anne architecture in New York (state)
Commercial buildings completed in 1840
Buildings and structures in Warren County, New York
National Register of Historic Places in Warren County, New York